Somerset Constabulary was the police force responsible for policing the county of Somerset, England, between 1856 and 1967.  It was formed as a result of the County and Borough Police Act 1856.  This act made it compulsory for the county authorities to form a county police force which up until this point had not been done.  During its 111 year history, five smaller police forces within Somerset were merged into Somerset Constabulary.  These were Wells City Police and Glastonbury Borough Police in 1856, Yeovil Borough Police in 1859, Chard Borough Police in 1889 and Bridgwater Borough Police in 1940.  Somerset Constabulary was amalgamated with Bath City Police on 1 January 1967 to become the Somerset and Bath Constabulary. As a result of the Local Government Act 1972 this new force was short lived, lasting just 7 years when on 1 April 1974 it became part of Avon and Somerset Constabulary which polices the area to this day.

Chief Constables
Somerset Constabulary
 1856–1884 : Valentine Goold 
 1884–1908 : Captain Charles German Allison 
 1908-1939 : Lieutenant-Colonel Herbert Charles Metcalfe 
 1939-1955 : James Edward Ryall, OBE 
 1955–1967 : Kenneth Walter Lawrence Steel  
Somerset and Bath Constabulary
 1967–1974 : Kenneth Walter Lawrence Steel

Officers killed in the line of duty 
The Police Roll of Honour Trust lists and commemorates all British police officers killed in the line of duty.  It lists 16 Somerset Constabulary officers who were killed/died during its existence including:
 PC Robert Hill, 1851, who died as a result of stab injuries sustained on duty in 1847.
 PC Alfred Pavey, 1861, who was killed as a result of injuries received when bludgeoned by two burglars.
 PC Kenneth Edwin Snook, 1942, killed by enemy action while on duty during an air raid.

References

Defunct police forces of England
History of Somerset